William Francis Marsh (January 13, 1916 - March 20, 1995) served in the California State Assembly for the 42nd district from 1953 to 1959. During World War II he served in the United States Marine Corps.

References

United States Marine Corps personnel of World War II
Republican Party members of the California State Assembly
1916 births
1995 deaths
People from Orange, New Jersey